An environmental protection area (: APA) is a type of protected area in Brazil that has some degree of human occupation, but where the primary intent is environmental protection. Human occupation is monitored and controlled. An environmental protection area often contains other types of conservation units, which may be more strictly protected.

Definition

Environmental protection areas (APAs) are defined as part of the National System of Conservation Units regulated by Law 9985 of 18 July 2000.
They are one of the types of sustainable use units, which try to reconcile conservation of nature with sustainable use of some natural resources.
Other types of sustainable use unit are significant ecological interest area, national forest, extractive reserve, fauna reserve, sustainable development reserve, and natural heritage particular reserve.

As of 1993 APAs were defined as areas where wildlife, genetic diversity and other natural resources were to be conserved through adequate and sustainable use for the benefit of the local population, following a management plan to harmonise the various human activities.
The APA was the closest concept to the Biosphere Reserve in Brazilian law, the main difference being that a strictly protected core zone was not required.
However, the Brazilian Institute of Environment and Renewable Natural Resources (IBAMA) was drawing up new definitions that would include the requirement for core zones in APAs.

An APA may be public or private.
Its main goal is to protect areas that are important to the well being and quality of life of humans through protecting biodiversity.
Often they cover huge areas, with no buffer zone between the APA and unprotected areas.
They fall under IUCN protected area category V: protected landscape/seascape.
As of 2015 APAs accounted for 30% of protected areas.
APA coverage in Brazil was:
Federal: 
State:   
Municipal: 
Environmental protection areas have a certain amount of human occupation, and may have environmental aspects that are important for aesthetic or cultural reasons to human populations.
An APA does not require that land be expropriated, but does impose specific requirements on land use.
An APA may contain other types of protected area, and must have a wildlife conservation area.
Federal APAs are administered by the Chico Mendes Institute for Biodiversity Conservation (ICMBio).

The APA concept is derived from the Portuguese concept of Parques Naturais, which in turn is derived from the French concept of Parcs Naturels Régionaux.
This has resulted in some inconsistencies with Brazilian law, which has caused some criticism.

Selected list

Environmentally protected areas include:

See also
Environmental governance in Brazil

Notes

Sources

Types of protected area of Brazil
Lists of protected areas of Brazil
Environmental law in Brazil